East Broad Street–Davie Avenue Historic District is a national historic district located at Statesville, Iredell County, North Carolina.  It encompasses 65 contributing buildings in a predominantly residential section of Statesville.  The district includes notable examples of Late Victorian architecture and were mainly built between about 1880 and 1930.  Notable buildings include the Elma Apartments building (late 1920s), Matt-Simons House, J. S. Ramsey House (c. 1885), and Major H. L. Allison House.

It was listed on the National Register of Historic Places in 1980.

References

Houses on the National Register of Historic Places in North Carolina
Historic districts on the National Register of Historic Places in North Carolina
Victorian architecture in North Carolina
Geography of Iredell County, North Carolina
National Register of Historic Places in Iredell County, North Carolina
Houses in Iredell County, North Carolina